"The Rip Van Winkle Caper" is episode 60 of the American television anthology series The Twilight Zone , and is the 24th episode of the second season. It originally aired on April 21, 1961 on CBS, and was written by series creator and showrunner Rod Serling, and was directed by Justus Addiss.

Opening narration

Plot
To escape the law after stealing $1 million worth of gold bricks from a train on its way from Fort Knox to Los Angeles, a band of four thieves, consisting of demolitions expert De Cruz, firearms expert Brooks, and mechanical engineer Erbie, led by scientist-mastermind Farwell, hide in a secret cave in Death Valley, California. Farwell explains that he has designed suspended animation chambers, in which they will sleep for approximately 100 years, figuring that by 2061 the gold will no longer be "hot" and they can sell it without arousing suspicion. DeCruz has reservations about going along with the plan, but all four undergo the procedure simultaneously.

When they wake up, all that remains of Erbie is his skeleton, his suspended animation chamber having been cracked by a falling rock. De Cruz offers to guard the gold in the back of their truck while Brooks drives to civilization, but Brooks does not trust De Cruz and insists that he drive. De Cruz kills Brooks by running into him with the truck, but when the brakes fail, he bails out and the truck crashes into a ravine. Farwell and De Cruz now must walk through the desert in the summer heat, carrying as much gold as they can on their backs.

Along the road, Farwell discovers he has lost his canteen, and De Cruz sells him a sip of water from his canteen, for the price of one gold bar. When the water is nearly gone and the fee goes up to two bars, Farwell strikes De Cruz with a gold brick, killing him. Farwell continues, gradually discarding gold bars as their weight becomes increasingly burdensome. Finally, weak and dehydrated, he collapses.

Farwell regains consciousness and finds a man standing over him. Farwell feebly offers him his last gold bar in exchange for water and a ride to the nearest town, but dies before the man can respond. The man returns to his futuristic car and tells his wife the man is dead. He remarks about the oddity of Farwell offering him a gold bar as if it were valuable. She reminds him that people once used it for money, but he points out that was a long time ago, before they found a way to manufacture it.

Closing narration

Production notes
The futuristic car carrying the couple who find the dying Farwell is a leftover prop, somewhat modified, from MGM's 1956 film Forbidden Planet.

See also
 List of The Twilight Zone (1959 TV series) episodes
"Rip Van Winkle", the 1819 short story by Washington Irving
Paradox of value

References
DeVoe, Bill. (2008). Trivia from The Twilight Zone. Albany, GA: Bear Manor Media. 
Grams, Martin. (2008). The Twilight Zone: Unlocking the Door to a Television Classic. Churchville, MD: OTR Publishing.

External links

1961 American television episodes
The Twilight Zone (1959 TV series season 2) episodes
Cryonics in fiction
Fiction set in 1961
2061
Works based on Rip Van Winkle
Television episodes written by Rod Serling